Holcobius haleakalae is a species of beetle in the family Ptinidae.

Subspecies
These two subspecies belong to the species Holcobius haleakalae:
 Holcobius haleakalae chrysodytus Perkins, 1910
 Holcobius haleakalae haleakalae Perkins, 1910

References

Further reading

 
 
 
 

Ptinidae
Beetles described in 1910